Riverdale Elementary School may refer to:

In Canada:
Riverdale Elementary School (British Columbia) — Surrey, British Columbia

In the United States:
Riverdale Elementary School (Anaheim, California) — Anaheim, California
Riverdale Elementary School (Garden Grove, California) — Garden Grove, California
Riverdale Elementary School (Colorado) — Thornton, Colorado
Riverdale Elementary School (Florida) — Orlando, Florida
Riverdale Elementary School (Georgia) — Riverdale, Georgia
Riverdale Elementary School (Port Byron, Illinois) — Port Byron, Illinois
Riverdale Elementary School (Rock Falls, Illinois) — Rock Falls, Illinois
Riverdale Elementary School (Indiana) — Saint Joe, Indiana
Riverdale Elementary School (Maryland) — Riverdale, Maryland
Riverdale Elementary School (Massachusetts) — Dedham, Massachusetts
Riverdale Public School (Nebraska) — Riverdale, Nebraska
Riverdale Public School (New Jersey) — Riverdale, New Jersey
Riverdale Elementary School (Forest, Ohio) — Forest, Ohio
Riverdale Elementary School (Mount Blanchard, Ohio) — Mount Blanchard, Ohio
Riverdale Elementary School (Oregon) — Portland, Oregon
Riverdale Elementary School (Tennessee) — Germantown, Tennessee
Riverdale Elementary School (Utah) — Ogden, Utah
Riverdale Elementary School (Wisconsin) — Muscoda, Wisconsin
Riverdale Heights Elementary School — Bettendorf, Iowa